RYO may refer to:

 Rio Turbio Airport, Argentina (by IATA code)
 Reading Youth Orchestra, an orchestra from Reading, UK
 Roll-your-own cigarette, cigarettes that are hand made
 Roll your own (poker), a term in poker jargon

See also
 Ryo (disambiguation)